Naoto Nishiguchi (西口 直人, born November 14, 1996 in Yao, Osaka) is a Japanese professional baseball pitcher for the Tohoku Rakuten Golden Eagles in Japan's Nippon Professional Baseball (NBP). He made his NPB debut in 2018, pitching in one game that season.

External links

NPB stats

1996 births
Living people
Japanese baseball players
Nippon Professional Baseball pitchers
Tohoku Rakuten Golden Eagles players
Baseball people from Osaka Prefecture